The Liga Profesional de Baloncesto (LPB), also known as the LPB Panama, is the top professional basketball league in Panama. The league was formed in 2015 by six clubs. Correcaminos de Colón has been the most successful team in the league with four won championships. 

Currently, the league consists of 7 teams.

History

The league was established on June 3, 2015 by the Federación Panameña de Baloncesto (FEPABA). Six newly established clubs entered the inaugural season of the league. The first game was played on October 2, 2015, between the Águilas de Río Abajo and the Caballos de Coclé. On December 15, 2015, the Correcaminos de Colón won the first-ever league title.

In 2020, the league expanded to 7 teams with the entrance of Dragones de Don Bosco.

Current teams

Timeline 

 * – Indicates championship season

Finals

Performance by team

In international competitions
Teams for the LPB can qualify to play in pan-American competitions organised by FIBA. The champions from each season are eligible to play in the group phase of the BCL Americas, the successor of the FIBA Americas League.

Individual awards

MVP

Statistical leaders

Points

Rebounds

Assists

References

External links
Official website 
Panamaian basketball at Latinasket.com
Federacion Panameña de Baloncesto

Basketball competitions in Panama
Pan